Michalis Polytarchou (Greek: Μιχάλης Πολυτάρχου; born June 23, 1983) is a Greek professional basketball player who plays for Triton of the Greek A2 Basket League. He is a 1.90 m (6' 2 ") tall shooting guard.

Professional career
Polytarchou began his career with the team of his homeland, Pannaxiakos, playing in the regional leagues of Cyclades. Later, he moved to Trikala 2000, Argonaftis Rafinas B.C., Ardittos B.C., and Ierapetra B.C., playing in the lower leagues of Greek Basketball. In 2008, he moved to Ikaros-Esperos Kallitheas, where he helped the team gain a promotion from the Greek B League to the Greek A2 League, and finally a promotion to the Greek Basket League (A1), where he scored 120 total points over two seasons. In 2012, he moved to the Greek club AEK Athens, helping the team gain a promotion from the Greek B League to the Greek A2 League, and also finally AEK's return to the Greek Basket League. During his tenure with AEK, he was the team's captain.

After his release from AEK Athens, he signed a two-year contract with Peristeri. With Peristeri, he also won a league promotion with the club to move back to the Greek Basket League. After he had originally renewed his contract with Peristeri through 2019, the two sides mutually agreed to part ways on September 30, 2018. Two days later, he joined Iraklis Thessaloniki, of the Greek 2nd Division.

Awards and accomplishments

Ikaros-Esperos Kallitheas
2009–10 Greek 2nd Division Champion

AEK Athens
2013–14 Greek 2nd Division Champion

Peristeri
2017–18 Greek 2nd Division Champion

References

External links
 Eurobasket.com Profile
 Greek Basket League Profile 
 AEK Profile 

1983 births
Living people
AEK B.C. players
Aigaleo B.C. players
Diagoras Dryopideon B.C. players
Greek men's basketball players
Ikaros B.C. players
Iraklis Thessaloniki B.C. players
People from Naxos
Peristeri B.C. players
Psychiko B.C. players
Shooting guards
Trikala B.C. players
Sportspeople from the South Aegean